Mike Beltran is a Mixed Martial Arts referee and a Republican member of the Florida Legislature representing the state's 57th House district, which includes part of Hillsborough County.

History
An attorney, Beltran is a graduate of the University of Pennsylvania and Harvard Law School. Beltran moved to Florida in 2010.

Mixed Martial Arts referee career 
Mike Beltran currently works for the Bellator MMA promotion. Beltran is best known for his symbolic mustache which stretches up to just above his waist. He also has been a referee in several major UFC fights, including the high-profile bout between Jon Jones and Alexander Gustafsson.

Beltran has been a referee for over 400 fights.

Florida House of Representatives
Beltran defeated Sean McCoy in the August 28, 2018 Republican primary, winning 53.2% of the vote. In the November 6, 2018 general election, Beltran won 55.27% of the vote, defeating Democrat Debbie Katt.

2019 Legislative Session 
Prompted by the inability of a local high school student to wear her National Guard uniform to her graduation (and subsequently unable to walk across the stage), Representative Beltran, along with Senator Tom Lee, sponsored HB 225. The bill allows for graduating students to wear uniforms of the National Guard or United States Armed Forces at high school graduation ceremonies. Additionally, Beltran, in conjunction with the Health Quality Subcommittee and cosponsors Rep. Jackie Toledo, Thad Altman, and Tom Leek, sponsored HB 7027, which instituted restrictions on vaping. The bill, whose companion bill (SB 7012) passed, stated that vaping in indoor spaces was prohibited, and that the act of vaping in, on, or within  of a school by any person under 18, was also prohibited. Beltran acted as a cosponsor for other bills, including HB 7125 (a bill which garnered attention for its “extensive reforms” to Florida's Criminal Justice System, with the goal of rehabilitation over incarceration and reallocation of funds), and HB 843, which he and Senator Gayle Harrell co-sponsored, that established the ability of outside physicians to inspect struggling programs and make recommendations (prompted by the rising mortality rates of pediatric heart patients at the All Children's Heart Institute).

2020 Legislative Session 
Beltran, along with the Justice Appropriations subcommittee and Rep. Clay Yarborough, sponsored HB 5301, a bill which established new county court and circuit court judges. This was in response to an order issued by the Florida Supreme Court (SC19-1907). The bill passed unanimously, and consequentially added six county court judges and four new circuit court judges. Rep. Beltran acted as the co-sponsor (along with numerous colleagues) for several bills which were succeeded by later companion bills. Occurrences of such, among others, include HB 23 (Panic Alarms in Public Schools, succeeded by SB 70), HB 265 (Abortion Consent Laws for Minors, succeeded by Republican-backed SB 404), and HB 7037 (Constitutional Amendments filed with the Judiciary Committee/Rep. James Grant, succeeded by SB 1794). Rep. Beltran also sponsored/co-sponsored bills that did not pass, including those that dealt with the safety of students walking to school with Rep. Jackie Toledo (HB 1043), the safety of transit workers while working (HB 951), and the limitation of attorney contingency risk multiplier fees in property insurance litigation, a bill which prompted thousands of petitions from homeowners (though the bill stalled in the senate).

Committees

2020 Session 
Currently, Beltran is a member of the Florida House Health Quality Subcommittee, Judiciary Committee, Justin Appropriations Subcommittee, and Local Administration Subcommittee.

References

Republican Party members of the Florida House of Representatives
Living people
21st-century American politicians
University of Pennsylvania alumni
Harvard Law School alumni
People from New York City
1984 births